Mark 16 is the final chapter of the Gospel of Mark in the New Testament of the Christian Bible. It begins after the sabbath, with Mary Magdalene, Mary the mother of James, and Salome bringing spices to the tomb to anoint Jesus' body. There they encounter the stone rolled away, the tomb open, and a young man dressed in white who announces the resurrection of Jesus (16:1-6). The two oldest manuscripts of Mark 16 (from the 300s) conclude with verse 8, which ends with the women fleeing from the empty tomb, and saying "nothing to anyone, because they were too frightened".

Textual critics have identified two distinct alternative endings: the "Longer Ending" (verses 9–20) and the unversed "Shorter Ending" or "lost ending", which appear together in six Greek manuscripts, and in dozens of Ethiopic copies. Modern versions of the New Testament generally include the Longer Ending, but place it in brackets or otherwise format it to show that it is not considered part of the original text.

Text

Textual witnesses
Some early manuscripts containing the text of this chapter are:
Codex Vaticanus (325-350; extant verses 1-8)
Codex Sinaiticus (330-360; extant verses 1-8)
Codex Bezae (~400; complete: 1-20)
Codex Alexandrinus (400-440; complete: 1-20)
Codex Ephraemi Rescriptus (~450; complete: 1-20)

Sources
While some scholars argue that Mark 16 is a Markan composition, others argue that the chapter comes from an older tradition in the pre-Markan passion story. Those arguing in favor of Markan creation point to the numerous time indicators in verse 2, which bear similarities to other phrases in Mark. The scholars who argue in favor of Mark's use of a prior tradition argue that phrases such as "on the first day of the week" instead of the "third day" motif indicates a primitive tradition. Furthermore, many phrases found in Mark 16 seem to be non-Markan in their vocabulary. Dale Allison argues that, "The reduction of the empty tomb to Markan creativity, whatever the redactional motivation postulated, is not a compelling point of view...the case for the redactional origin  of Mark 16:1-8 is unpersuasive, which is why so many Markan scholars, despite their differences on the details, see tradition here." The fact that Mark 16 is extremely reserved in its theological expression, having no Christological titles, proofs or prophecies, descriptions of the resurrection, and a reserved description of the angel at the tomb indicate a more primitive narrative source.

Verses 1-8 (the empty tomb)

Verses 1–2

Mark states that the Sabbath is now over. Just after sunrise, Mary Magdalene, another Mary, the mother of James, and Salome come with spices to anoint Jesus' body.

Luke 24:1 states that the women had "prepared" the spices but  seems to say that Nicodemus had already anointed his body. John 20:1 and Matthew 28:1 simply say "Mary Magdalene and the other Mary" came to see the tomb.

Verses 3–4

The women wonder how they will remove the stone over the tomb. Upon their arrival, they find the stone already gone and go into the tomb. According to Jesuit writer John J. Kilgallen, this shows that in Mark's account they expected to find the body of Jesus. Instead, they find a young man dressed in a white robe who is sitting on the right and who tells them that Jesus "has risen" and shows them "the place where they laid him" (verses 5–7).

Verses 5–7

The white robe indicates that he is an angel: Matthew 28:5 describes him as such. In the account in  there were two men. John says there were two angels, but that Mary saw them after finding the empty tomb and showing it to the other disciples. She comes back to the tomb, talks to the angels, and then Jesus appears to her.

Jesus had predicted his resurrection and returning to Galilee during the Last Supper in Mark. Mark uses the passive verb form ēgerthē, translated "he was raised", indicating God raised him from the dead, rather than "he is risen", as translated in the NIV.

Peter, last seen in tears two mornings previously, having denied any knowledge of Jesus, is mentioned in particular. Gregory the Great notes that "had the Angel not referred to him in this way, Peter would never have dared to appear again among the Apostles. He is bidden then by name to come, so that he will not despair because of his denial of Christ".

The last appearance of Peter's name in verse 7 (also the last among the disciples' names to be mentioned) can be connected to the first appearance of his name (as 'Simon') in Mark 1:16 to form a literary inclusio of eyewitness testimony to indicate Peter as the main eyewitness source in the Gospel of Mark.

Verse 8

Mark 16:1-8 ends with the response of the women: Those women, who are afraid (compare ), then flee and keep quiet about what they saw. Kilgallen comments that fear is the most common human reaction to the divine presence in the Bible.

This is where the undisputed part of Mark's Gospel ends. Jesus is thus announced to have been raised from the dead, and to have gone ahead of the disciples to Galilee, where they will see Him.

Alternate endings
Mark has two additional endings, the longer ending (verse 9–20), and the shorter ending (unversed).

Longer ending of Mark (verse 9-20)

Text and interpretation
In this 12-verse passage, the author refers to Jesus' appearances to Mary Magdalene, two disciples, and then the Eleven (the Twelve Apostles minus Judas). The text concludes with the Great Commission, declaring that believers that have been baptized will be saved while nonbelievers will be condemned, and pictures Jesus taken to Heaven and sitting at the Right Hand of God.

: Jesus appears to Mary Magdalene, who is now described as someone whom Jesus healed from possession by seven demons. She then "tells the other disciples" what she saw, but no one believes her.

: Jesus appears "in a different form" to two unnamed disciples. They, too, are disbelieved when they tell what they saw.

: Jesus then appears at dinner to all the remaining eleven Apostles. He rebukes them for not believing the earlier reports of his resurrection and tells them to go and "proclaim the good news to all creation. The one who believes and is baptised will be saved; but the one who does not believe will be condemned." Belief and non-belief are a dominant theme in the Longer Ending: there are two references to believing (verses 16 and 17) and four references to not believing (verses 11, 13, 14 and 16). Johann Albrecht Bengel, in his Gnomon of the New Testament, defends the disciples: "They did believe: but presently there recurred to them a suspicion as to the truth, and even positive unbelief."

: Jesus states that believers will "speak in new tongues". They will also be able to handle snakes, be immune from any poison they might happen to drink, and will be able to heal the sick. Kilgallen, picturing an author putting words in Jesus' mouth, has suggested that these verses were a means by which early Christians asserted that their new faith was accompanied by special powers. According to Brown, by showing examples of unjustified unbelief in verses 10-13, and stating that unbelievers will be condemned and that believers will be validated by signs, the author may have been attempting to convince the reader to rely on what the disciples preached about Jesus.

: Jesus is then taken up into heaven where, Mark claims, he sits at the right hand of God. The author refers to Psalm 110:1, quoted in Mark 11, about the Lord sitting at the right hand of God.

: the eleven go out and "proclaimed the good news everywhere"; this is known as the Dispersion of the Apostles. Several signs from God accompanied their preaching. Luke-Acts, however, has this happening in Jerusalem.

Shorter ending of Mark (unversed)
The "Shorter Ending" (first manuscript c. 3rd century), with slight variations, is usually unversed, and runs as follows:

While the New Revised Standard Version places this verse between verse 8 and 9, it could also be read as verse 21, covering the same topics as verse 9–20.

Manuscript versions

Manuscripts without either ending

The earliest extant complete manuscripts of Mark, Codex Sinaiticus and Codex Vaticanus, two 4th-century manuscripts, do not contain the last twelve verses, 16:9–20, nor the unversed shorter ending. Codex Vaticanus (4th century) has a blank column after ending at 16:8 and placing kata Markon, "according to Mark". There are three other blank columns in Vaticanus, in the Old Testament, but they are each due to incidental factors in the production of the codex: a change to the column-format, a change of scribes, and the conclusion of the Old Testament portion of the text. The blank column between Mark 16:8 and the beginning of Luke, however, is deliberately placed.

Other manuscripts which omit the last twelve verses include: Syriac Sinaiticus (late 4th-century); Minuscule 304 (12th century); a Sahidic manuscript; over 100 Armenian manuscripts; the two oldest Georgian manuscripts. The Armenian Version was made in 411-450, and the Old Georgian Version was based mainly on the Armenian Version.

Manuscripts having only the longer ending

Manuscripts including verses 9–20 in its traditional form
 The Majority/Byzantine Text (over 1,500 manuscripts of Mark).
 A group of manuscripts known as "Family 13" adds verses 16:9–20 in its traditional form.
 About a dozen uncials (the earliest being Codex Alexandrinus) and in all undamaged minuscules. Uncials: A, C, D, W, Codex Koridethi, and minuscules: 33, 565, 700, 892, 2674.
 the Vulgate and part of the Old Latin, Syriac Curetonian, Peshitta, Bohairic, Gothic.

Manuscripts including verses 9–20 with a notation 
 A group of manuscripts known as "Family 1" add a note to Mark 16:9–20, stating that some copies do not contain the verses. Including minuscules: 22, 138, 205, 1110, 1210, 1221, 1582.
 One Armenian manuscript, Matenadaran 2374 (formerly known as Etchmiadsin 229), made in 989, features a note, written between 16:8 and 16:9, Ariston eritzou, that is, "By Ariston the Elder/Priest". Ariston, or Aristion, is known from early traditions (preserved by Papias and others) as a colleague of Peter and as a bishop of Smyrna in the first century.

Manuscripts  including verses 9–20 without divisions 
A group of manuscripts known as "Family K1"  add Mark 16:9-10 without numbered  (chapters) at the margin and their  (titles) at the top (or the foot). This includes Minuscule 461.

Manuscripts including verses 9–20 with the "Freer Logion" 

Noted in manuscripts according to Jerome.

Codex Washingtonianus (late 4th, early 5th century) includes verses 9–20, and features an addition between 16:14-15, known as the "Freer Logion":

Manuscripts containing the shorter ending

Manuscript only having the shorter ending 
In only one Latin manuscript from c. 430, the Codex Bobbiensis, "k", VL 1, the "Shorter Ending" appears without the "Longer Ending". In this Latin copy , the text of Mark 16 is anomalous:
 It contains an interpolation between 16:3 and 16:4 which appears to present Christ's ascension occurring at that point: 
 It omits the last part of 16:8: "and they said nothing to anyone, for they were afraid.";
 It contains some variations in its presentation of the "Shorter Ending".

Manuscripts having both the shorter and the longer ending 
The following manuscripts add the "shorter ending" after 16:8, and follow it with vv. 9–20:
 Eight Greek manuscripts, including the Codex L (019) (8th cent.); Codex Ψ (044); Uncial 083; Uncial 099; 
 minuscule 274 (margin); minuscule 579, lectionary 1602;
 Syriac Harclean margin;
 Ethiopic manuscripts;
 Coptic texts: Sahidic manuscripts, Bohairic manuscripts (Huntington MS 17).

Writings of the Church Fathers 
Excluding verses 9-20: Eusebius, manuscripts according to Eusebius, manuscripts according to Jerome (who was recycling part of Eusebius' statements, condensing them as he loosely rendered them into Latin).
Including verses 9-20: Irenaeus; manuscripts according to Eusebius; Marinus; Acts of Pilate; manuscripts according to Jerome (add with obeli f 1 al); Ambrose; Aphraates; Augustine; Augustine's Latin copies; Augustine's Greek manuscripts; Tatian's Diatessaron; Eznik of Golb; Pelagius; Nestorius; Patrick; Prosper of Aquitaine; Leo the Great; Philostorgius; Life of Samson of Dol; Old Latin breves; Marcus Eremita; Peter Chrysologus. Also, Fortunatianus (c. 350) states that Mark mentions Jesus' ascension.

Explanations 
Both the shorter and the longer ending are considered to be later writings, which were added to Mark. Scholars disagree whether verse 8 was the original ending, or if there was an ending which is now lost. In the early 20th century, the view prevailed that the original ending was lost, but in the second part of the 20th century the view prevailed that verse 8 was the original ending, as intended by the author.

Ending at verse 8
Among the scholars who reject Mark 16:9–20, a debate continues about whether the ending at 16:8 is intentional or accidental.

Intentional
Numerous arguments have been given to explain why verse 8 is the intended ending.

According to Brown, this ending is consistent with Mark's theology, where even miracles, such as the resurrection, do not produce the proper understanding or faith among Jesus' followers. Richard A. Burridge argues that, in keeping with Mark's picture of discipleship, the question of whether it all comes right in the end is left open:

Burridge compares the ending of Mark to its beginning:

Kilgallen proposes that maybe Mark gives no description of the resurrected Jesus because Mark did not want to try to describe the nature of the divine resurrected Jesus. Some interpreters have concluded that Mark's intended readers already knew the traditions of Jesus' appearances, and that Mark brings the story to a close here to highlight the resurrection and leave anticipation of the parousia (Second Coming). Others have argued that this announcement of the resurrection and Jesus going to Galilee is the parousia (see also Preterism), but Raymond E. Brown argues that a parousia confined only to Galilee is improbable.

Unintentional

The final sentence in verse 8 is regarded as strange by some scholars. In the Greek text, it finishes with the conjunction γαρ (gar, "for"). It is contended by some who see 16:9–20 as originally Markan that γαρ literally means because, and this ending to verse 8 is therefore not grammatically coherent (literally, it would read they were afraid because). However, γαρ may end a sentence and does so in various Greek compositions, including some sentences in the Septuagint; Protagoras, a contemporary of Socrates, even ended a speech with γαρ. Although γαρ is never the first word of a sentence, there is no rule against it being the last word, even though it is not a common construction. If the Gospel of Mark intentionally concluded with this word, it would be one of only a few narratives in antiquity to do so.

Some scholars argue that Mark never intended to end so abruptly: either he planned another ending that was never written, or the original ending has been lost. The references to a future meeting in Galilee between Jesus and the disciples (in Mark 14:28 and 16:7) could suggest that Mark intended to write beyond 16:8. C. H. Turner argued that the original version of the Gospel could have been a codex, with the last page being especially vulnerable to damage. Many scholars, including Rudolf Bultmann, have concluded that the Gospel most likely ended with a Galilean resurrection appearance and the reconciliation of Jesus with the Eleven, even if verses 9–20 were not written by the original author of the Gospel of Mark.

Longer ending

Later addition
Most scholars agree that verses 9–20 were not part of the original text of Mark but are a later addition.Funk, Robert W. and the 1985 Jesus Seminar. The acts of Jesus: the search for the authentic deeds of Jesus. HarperSanFrancisco. 1998. "Empty Tomb, Appearances & Ascension" p. 449-495.

Critical questions concerning the authenticity of verses 9–20 (the "longer ending") often center on stylistic and linguistic issues. On linguistics, E. P. Gould identified 19 of the 163 words in the passage as distinctive and not occurring elsewhere in the Gospel. Dr. Bruce Terry argues that a vocabulary-based case against Mark 16:9–20 is indecisive, inasmuch as other 12-verse sections of Mark contain comparable numbers of once-used words.

Robert Gundry mentions that only about 10% of Mark's γαρ clauses (6 out of 66) conclude pericopes. Thus he infers that, rather than concluding 16:1–8, verse 8 begins a new pericope, the rest of which is now lost to us. Gundry therefore does not see verse 8 as the intended ending; a resurrection narrative was either written, then lost, or planned but never actually written.

Concerning style, the degree to which verses 9–20 aptly fit as an ending for the Gospel remains in question. The turn from verse 8 to 9 has also been seen as abrupt and interrupted: the narrative flows from "they were afraid" to "now after he rose", and seems to reintroduce Mary Magdalene. Secondly, Mark regularly identifies instances where Jesus' prophecies are fulfilled, yet Mark does not explicitly state the twice predicted reconciliation of Jesus with his disciples in Galilee (Mark 14:28, 16:7). Lastly, the active tense "he rose" is different from the earlier passive construction "[he] has been risen" of verse 6, seen as significant by some.

Dating
Because of patristic evidence from the late 100s for the existence of copies of Mark with 16:9-20, scholars widely date the composition of the longer ending to the early 2nd century.Kelhoffer, J. Miracle and Mission: The Authentication of Missionaries and their Message in the Longer Ending of Mark, 2000, 169-244.

Aimed addition or independent longer ending
Scholars are divided on the question of whether the "Longer Ending" was created deliberately to finish the Gospel of Mark, as contended by James Kelhoffer, or if it began its existence as a freestanding text which was used to "patch" the otherwise abruptly ending text of Mark. Metzger and Ehrman note that

Intertextuality
Verses 9–20 share the subject of Jesus' post-resurrection appearances, and other points, with other passages in the New Testament. This has led some scholars to believe that Mark 16:9–20 is based on the other books of the New Testament, filling in details which were originally lacking from Mark. Jesus' reference to drinking poison (16:18) does not correspond to a New Testament source, but that miraculous power did appear in Christian literature from the 2nd century CE on.

Julie M. Smith notes that if there was an original ending, "then the Resurrection accounts in Matthew and/or Luke may contain material from Mark’s original ending.

Shorter ending
The shorter ending appears only in a minimal number of manuscripts as the sole ending. It is a quick summary, which contradicts verse 8. It probably originated in Egypt, and diverges from the style of Mark. The shorter ending appears in a manuscript sometime after the 3rd century.

See also
 List of New Testament verses not included in modern English translations
 Johannine Comma
 Jesus and the woman taken in adultery
 John 21
 Luke 22:43–44
 Matthew 16:2b–3
 Overview of resurrection appearances in the Gospels and Paul
 Stolen body hypothesis

 Notes 

 References 
 Citations 
 Citations to printed sources

 Citations to web sources

 Sources 
 Printed sources

 Beavis, M. A., Mark's Audience, Sheffield, Sheffield Academic Press, 1989. .
.
 

 Elliott, J. K., The Language and Style of the Gospel of Mark. An Edition of C. H. Turner's "Notes on Markan Usage" together with Other Comparable Studies, Leiden, Brill, 1993. .
 

 Gundry, R. H., Mark: A Commentary on His Apology for the Cross, Chapters 9–16, Grand Rapids, Wm. B. Eerdmans Publishing Co., 1992. .

 

 MacDonald, Dennis R. "The Homeric Epics and the Gospel of Mark" Yale University Press, 2000 .
 Miller, Robert J. (ed.), The Complete Gospels.'' Polebridge Press, 1994. .

External links

 WELS Topical Q&A: Mark 16:9-20 - Inspiration, Signs, Miracles - believing that Mark 16:9-20 clearly belong in the sacred text without reservation
 Mark 16 in Manuscript Comparator — allows two or more New Testament manuscript editions' readings of the passage to be compared in side-by-side and unified views (similar to diff output)
 The various endings of Mark Detailed text-critical description of the evidence, the manuscripts, and the variants of the Greek text (PDF, 17 pages)
 Extracts from authors arguing for the authenticity of Mark 16:9–20
 Aichele, G., "Fantasy and Myth in the Death of Jesus" A literary-critical affirmation of Mark's Gospel ending at 16:8.
 Catholic Encyclopedia: Gospel of Saint Mark: Section IV. STATE OF TEXT AND INTEGRITY
 Last Twelve Verses of the Gospel According to S. Mark Vindicated Against Recent Critical Objectors and Established A Book written by Burgon, John William
 The Authenticity of Mark 16:9–20 A detailed defense of Mark 16:9–20, featuring replicas of portions of Codex Vaticanus and Codex Sinaiticus and a list of early patristic evidence.  See also http://www.curtisvillechristianchurch.org/AuthSuppl.htm for manuscript-images and other materials.
 Mark 16:9-20 as Forgery or Fabrication A detailed case against Mark 16:9–20, including all relevant stylistic, textual, manuscript, and patristic evidence, and an extensive bibliography.
 King James Bible - Wikisource
English Translation with Parallel Latin Vulgate 
Online Bible at GospelHall.org (ESV, KJV, Darby, American Standard Version, Bible in Basic English)
Multiple bible versions at Bible Gateway (NKJV, NIV, NRSV etc.)

Biblical criticism
Gospel of Mark chapters
King James Only movement
Empty tomb
Post-resurrection appearances of Jesus